Brazzaville is an American indie pop band founded in 1997 by David Brown. Brown was at one time Beck's saxophonist and took part in recording of Odelay and Midnite Vultures. On May 7, 2009, David Brown officially announced the dissolution of the band, stating that he would henceforth be recording and releasing music under the name David Arthur Brown, albeit with "many of the wonderful musicians who have contributed to Brazzaville records." However, June 23, 2009, David once again announced that the band will continue to exist in parallel with a solo career.

Members 

 David Arthur Brown (singer): songwriter, vocals, guitar.
 Richie Alvarez: keyboards.
 Ramon Aragall: drums.
 Mike Bolger: trumpet, piano, accordion.
 Rob Gibiaqui: drums.
 Smokey Hormel: guitar.
 Paco Jordi: guitars, backing vocals.
 Feryin Kaya: bass.
 Ivan Knight: drums.
 Brady Lynch: bass.
 Kenny Lyon: guitar, ukulele, melodica, backing vocals.
 Maria Pi-Sunyer de Gispert: vocals.
 David Ralicke: saxophone, trombone.
 Dima Shvetsov: drums.
 Joel Virgel: drums, percussion, backing vocals.
 Oleg Zaytseff: keyboards.
 Joe Zimmerman: bass, backing vocals.

Discography

Albums 

 2002 (South China Sea, 1998)
 Somnambulista (South China Sea, 2000)
 Rouge On Pockmarked Cheeks (South China Sea, 2002)
 Hastings Street (Zakat, 2004)
 East L.A. Breeze (Zakat, 2006), (Vendlus Records, 2006)
 21st Century Girl (Zakat, 2008), (Vendlus Records, 2008)
 Brazzaville in Istanbul (Doublemoon Records, 2009) — live album
 Jetlag Poetry (Zakat, 2011)
 Morro Bay (2013)
 The Oceans of Ganymede (2016)
 Dream Sea (2018)
 Sheila's Dream (2020)

Compilations 
 Welcome to... Brazzaville (Web of Mimicry, 2004), (Zakat, 2005)
 Welcome to Brazzaville II (Zakat, 2012)

Radio singles 
 Star Called Sun (Viktor Tsoi cover, 2006)
 The Clouds in Camarillo (2007)
 Teenage Summer Days (Alexin cover, 2009)

Music videos
 Foreign Disaster Days (2005)
 Jesse James (2006)
 Star Called Sun (2006)
 Peach Tree (2006)
 Bosphorus (2006)
 The Clouds in Camarillo feat. Minerva (2007) 
 Girl From Vladivostok (Devushka From Vladivostok) (2009)
 Anabel 2 (2011)
 Rather Stay Home (2011)
 Boeing (2012)
 Barcelona (2012)

References

External links 

 Official Brazzaville site
 
 Brazzaville songs lyrics
 Brazzaville page at Wimstream.com

American expatriates in Spain
American pop music groups
Culture in Barcelona
Musical groups established in 1997
Indie pop groups from Los Angeles